Weekly Toro Station (週刊トロ・ステーション, Shūkan Toro Sutēshon) is a video game developed by Bexide and Sony Computer Entertainment for the PlayStation 3 and PlayStation Portable. It is the sequel to Mainichi Issho and was released on November 11, 2009 through the Japanese PlayStation Store. Some services were terminated on March 28, 2013, and the services were completely terminated at the end of September 2013.

Toro Station
Weekly Toro Station is actually a replacement for Mainichi Issho. Free digital distribution of Mainichi Issho lasted from November 11, 2006 to November 11, 2009. Mainichi Issho 's core feature was the daily news service called Toro Station (トロ・ステーション). This costly service was discontinued and replaced with a, lighter, weekly service that focuses more on video games and manga/anime culture news.

Characters

Toro
Kuro
TV
Producer
Nyavatar

Game Center (ゲームセンター)
All ten mini games from Mainichi Issho are now gathered and available for free in the Game Center (ゲームセンター, Gēmu Sentā). That includes the once pay per play games that required a service subscription such as the cosplay license. The Game Center's collectible capsule toys are still available and can be purchased with medals (10 medals cost 100 yen, 60 medals are 500 yen). There are all kind of mini games: solo games, two-player games, online multiplayer games, some of them are even motion sensor controlled. 
Mainichi Right Brain Ranking (まいにち右脳ランキング)
Mainichi Right Brain Battle (まいにち右脳バトル)
Mainichi Picture Shiritori (まいにちピクチャーしりとり)
Angel Shooting (天使シューティング)
Koi no Mi no Bori (コイの三のぼり)
Nobi Nobi Snake (のび のび スネーク)
Toro Racer (トロレーサー)
Bowling (ボウリング)
Speed (スピード)
Tennis (テニス)

Platinya Membership (プラチニャ会員)
"Platinya" is a pun at "platinum" and "nya", the latter being the Japanese equivalent to "meow", the cat's scream. Platinya Membership consists in an 800 yen 30-day subscription that allows the gamer to get access to exclusive contents such as Toro Station back numbers.

References

External links
Official website
Menu Translations

2009 video games
PlayStation 3 games
PlayStation Portable games
PlayStation Network games
Sony Interactive Entertainment games
Japan-exclusive video games
Video games developed in Japan
Multiplayer and single-player video games